Melchiorre Cesarotti (May 15, 1730 – November 4, 1808) was an Italian poet, translator and theorist.

Biography

He was born at Padua, of a noble but impoverished family.  He studied in the Seminary of Padua, where he obtained, immediately after the end of his studies, the chair of Rhetoric. At the University of Padua his literary progress gained him the professorship of Greek and Hebrew in 1768, and then of Rhetorics and Literature in 1797. As a supporter of the Enlightenment ideas, he wrote in favor of the French on their invasion of Italy in 1797; he received a pension, and was made knight of the iron crown by Napoleon I, to whom  he addressed a bombastic and flattering poem called Pronea (1807).

Cesarotti is best known as a translator and a theorist. His translation of Ossian (Padua 1763 and 1772) attracted much attention in Italy and France, and raised up many imitators of the Ossianic style. Napoleon particularly admired the work. As a professor of Greek in the University of Padua, Cesarotti published also a full translation of Demosthenes, and two different versions of  Homer's Iliad: one faithful and literal, the other (called The Death of Hector) supposed to improve the text in order to adapt it to modern taste.

As a theorist and a critic, Cesarotti produced several prose works, including a Course of Greek Literature, and essays On the Origin and Progress of the Poetic Art (1762), On the Sources of the Pleasure derived from Tragedy (1762), On the Philosophy of Taste (1784). His Essay on the Philosophy of Language (1785) is one of the most remarkable works in the field of linguistics written in Italy at the age of Enlightenment.

A complete edition of his works, in 42 vols. 8vo, began to appear at Pisa in 1800, and was completed in 1813, after his death.

Notes

References
 
 Gennaro Barbarisi e Giulio Carnazzi (a cura di), Aspetti dell'opera e della fortuna di Melchiorre Cesarotti, 2 volumi, Milano, Cisalpino, 2002.
 Antonio Daniele (a cura di), Melchiorre Cesarotti, Atti del convegno Padova 2008, Padova, Esedra, 2011.
 Claudio Chiancone, La scuola di Cesarotti e gli esordi del giovane Foscolo, Pisa, Edizioni ETS, 2012.

1730 births
1808 deaths
18th-century Italian poets
Italian poets
Italian male poets
Italian translators
University of Padua alumni
Academic staff of the University of Padua
Translators of Ancient Greek texts
18th-century Italian translators